Tomaso Catullo (1782–1869) was a Venetian physician, geologist, paleontologist, zoologist and educator of outstanding work in the Università di Padova.

He was born in Belluno, Northern Italy, the son of a middle-class Venetian family. He did his elemental studies in his hometown and was graduated from the University of Padova around 1806.  In 1811, he was appointed, Professor of Natural History in Lyceum of Belluno. For his outstanding work Catullo gets, Chair of Natural History in the University of Padua, in the year 1829. He also received an honorary doctorate delivered by the University of Padua in 1833. 

In 1840 he was appointed as a member of Accademia nazionale delle scienze. He was the author of numerous publications, including Manuale mineralogico, 1812, Saggio di zoologia fossile, 1827, Catalogo ragionato degli animali vertebrati, 1838,  Osservazioni sopra uno scritto del Achille de Zigno, 1847, and Dei terreni di sedimento superiore delle Venezie, 1856.

References

External links 
www.accademiaxl.it

1782 births
1869 deaths
18th-century Italian people
19th-century Italian people
19th-century Italian physicians
Physicians from Venice
Heads of universities in Italy
University of Padua alumni
Academic staff of the University of Padua